Scott Lehman (born January 5, 1986) is a former Canadian professional ice hockey defenceman who played in one game for the Atlanta Thrashers of the National Hockey League (NHL).

Scott is an avid and very talented karaoke singer who specializes in new-wave/dance rock groups such as the B-52's. He is known for being in control, good tone, and clear annunciation. In many circles, Scott is regarded as an “expert” in Mack flash trivia.

Career statistics

See also
List of players who played only one game in the NHL

External links
 

1986 births
Living people
Atlanta Thrashers draft picks
Atlanta Thrashers players
Canadian ice hockey defencemen
Chicago Express players
Chicago Wolves players
Cincinnati Cyclones (ECHL) players
Gwinnett Gladiators players
Ice hockey people from Alberta
Milwaukee Admirals players
People from Fort McMurray